The 377th Fighter Squadron is a United States Air Force active duty unit stationed at Montgomery Air National Guard Base, Alabama. It is an Active Associate Unit administratively assigned to the 495th Fighter Group at Shaw Air Force Base, South Carolina and integrated operationally with the 100th Fighter Squadron of the Alabama Air National Guard’s 187th Fighter Wing.

The squadron was first activated in March 1943 as one of the original squadrons of the 362d Fighter Group.  After training in the United States, the squadron deployed to the European Theater of Operations later that year. The squadron began combat operations in February 1944 and moved to the continent following D-Day, moving forward to Germany as American forces advanced.  It continued combat operations with Republic P-47 Thunderbolts until V-E Day, earning two Distinguished Unit Citations.  It returned to the United States in September 1945 and had begun training with the North American P-51 Mustang at Biggs Field, Texas, when it was inactivated in August 1946 and its personnel and equipment transferred to another unit.

World War II 
The 377th Fighter Squadron was established on 1 March 1943 at Westover Field, Massachusetts as part of the 362nd Fighter Group, equipped with Republic P-47D Thunderbolt. A year later, on 8 February 1944 they deployed to the European Theater of Operations (ETO) for combat as a part of the Ninth Air Force in England. There they remained engaged in combat operations until 1 May 1945.

On 9 September 1945 they were reassigned back to the United States and assigned to First Air Force at Seymour Johnson Field, North Carolina, while being programmed for deployment to Okinawa to take part in the planned Invasion of Japan. As a result of the Atomic bombings of Hiroshima and Nagasaki and the sudden end of the Pacific War, the deployment plans were canceled, however the unit was retained as part of the Second Air Force under Continental Air Forces and reassigned to Biggs Field, Texas, where they were equipped with the North American P-51 Mustang. The 377th Fighter Squadron was later Inactivated on 1 August 1946 due to postwar budget restrictions.

Active associate unit 
The squadron was reactivated at Montgomery Air National Guard Base during a ceremony on 17 October 2014, replacing Detachment 100 of the 495th Fighter Group. As an Active Associate Unit it is part of the "Total Force Integration" initiative whereby Regular Air Force personnel work side-by-side with host Air National Guard personnel in a to share resources, reduce duplication of effort, and increase the Air Force's ability to provide combat airpower.

Lineage
 Constituted as the 377th Fighter Squadron on 11 February 1943  
 Activated on 1 March 1943  
 Inactivated on 1 August 1946  
 Activated on 7 November 2015

Assignments
 362d Fighter Group, 1 March 1943 – 1 August 1946
 495th Fighter Group, 7 November 2015 – present

Stations

 Westover Field, Massachusetts, 1 March 1943
 Bradley Field, Connecticut, 21 June 1943
 Suffolk County Army Air Field, New York, 16 September 1943
 Mitchel Field, New York, 7 October 1943
 RAF Wormingford (AAF-159), England, 30 November 1943
 RAF Headcorn (AAF-412), England, 15 April 1944
 Lignerolles Airfield (A-12), France, 7 July 1944
 Rennes/St-Jacques Airfield (A-27), France, 12 August 1944
 Prosnes Airfield (A-79), France, 22 September 1944

 Verdun Airfield (A-82), France, 22 November 1944
 Frankfurt/Rhine-Main Airfield (Y-73), Germany, 14 April 1945
 Fürth/Industrieflughafen Airfield (R-30), Germany, 2 May 1945
 Illesheim Airfield (R-10), Germany, 4 May 1945
 AAF Station Straubing (R-68), Germany, 15 May 1945
 Seymour Johnson Field, North Carolina, 9 September 1945
 Biggs Field, Texas, 6 December 1945 – 1 August 1946
 Montgomery Air National Guard Base, Alabama, 7 November 2015 – present

Aircraft
 Republic P-47D Thunderbolt, 1943 – 1945
 North American P-51H Mustang, 1945 – 1946
 General Dynamics F-16 Fighting Falcon, 2015 – present

Awards and campaigns

References

Notes
Explanatory notes

 Citations

Bibliography

 
 
 
 
 
 

Fighter squadrons of the United States Army Air Forces
Military units and formations established in 1943
Fighter squadrons of the United States Air Force